The Plot to Kill Hitler  is a 1990 television film based on the July 20 plot by German High Command to kill Adolf Hitler in 1944. Brad Davis stars as Colonel Claus Schenk Graf von Stauffenberg, who plants a bomb in the conference room of the Führer's headquarters in East Prussia.

Plot summary 
Led by Army Colonel Claus von Stauffenberg, several German High Command officers plan to assassinate Adolf Hitler and take control of the German government, with the ultimate intention of surrendering their country to the Allies. Stauffenberg manages to plant a bomb, hidden in his briefcase, in Hitler's battlefield headquarters. By sheer luck, Heinz Brandt unwittingly moves the briefcase slightly, and Hitler survives the subsequent blast. In the final hours of July 20, 1944, Stauffenberg, Lieutenant Werner von Haeften, General Friedrich Olbricht, Ludwig Beck, and Colonel Albrecht Mertz von Quirnheim are arrested and tried. Beck commits suicide, and the rest are taken to be executed. Stauffenberg declares "Long live the sacred Germany!" before being killed, and the others are also killed beside him within seconds.

Cast
 Brad Davis as Colonel Claus von Stauffenberg
 Madolyn Smith as Nina von Stauffenberg
 Ian Richardson as General Ludwig Beck
 Kenneth Colley as Field Marshal Wilhelm Keitel
 Michael Byrne as General Friedrich Olbricht
 Helmut Lohner as General Friedrich Fromm
 Jonathan Hyde as Dr. Joseph Goebbels
 Rupert Graves as Axel von dem Bussche
 Helmut Griem as Field Marshal Erwin Rommel
 Mike Gwilym as Adolf Hitler
 Vernon Dobtcheff as General Erich Fellgiebel
 Christoph Eichhorn as General Helmuth Stieff
 Michael Fitzegerald as Major Ernst John von Freyend
 Jack Hedley as General Adolf Heusinger
 Heather Chasen as The Baroness
 Burkhard Heyl as Colonel Albrecht Mertz von Quirnheim
 Timothy Watson as Major Ernst Remer

Production 
The movie was filmed in the United States and Zagreb, Yugoslavia.

External links 
 

1990 films
American World War II films
Films about the 20 July plot
Films set in Berlin
Films shot in Croatia
Films shot in Yugoslavia
Films directed by Lawrence Schiller
The Wolper Organization films
Cultural depictions of Erwin Rommel
Films scored by Laurence Rosenthal
CBS network films
1990s English-language films